The Sarasota Opera House (originally the Edwards Theatre) is an historic theatre, now opera house, located at 61 North Pineapple Avenue in Sarasota, Florida. The building was the vision of A.B. Edwards, the first mayor of Sarasota. It opened on April 10, 1926, with a three-story entrance containing eight shops on the ground floor, 12 offices on the second floor, and 12 furnished apartments on the third. The theatre's auditorium contained an orchestral pipe organ. As noted on the Sarasota Opera's website, the Sarasota Herald-Tribune hailed Edwards for "having admitted Sarasota into a fairyland of costly decoration, rich furnishings and never to be forgotten artistry."

The building was designed by Roy A. Benjamin in the Mediterranean Revival Style Architecture and constructed by the GA Miller Construction Company.

The theatre is the home of the Sarasota Opera Association, Inc., which owns the building. The Association is the parent body that runs the Sarasota Opera. The house contains 1,119 seats.

Early history
In the 1920s, the building quickly became a popular entertainment venue with major performers of the day, such as Will Rogers (in 1927) and the Ziegfeld Follies (1928) appearing there.   The world premiere of Cecil B. DeMille's The Greatest Show on Earth (which had been filmed in Sarasota) was shown there in late 1951, attended by its stars Charlton Heston and Dorothy Lamour. Elvis Presley performed a concert there on February 21, 1956.

Over the years, managements changed as did the name of the theatre: in December 1936 it became The Florida Theatre while, in the same year, a hurricane damaged the Robert-Morton pipe organ. Various attempts to modernize removed most of its original Art Deco features. It then became a full-time movie theater, but in 1973, it closed.

Renovations
By the early 1970s, the non-profit Asolo Opera Guild began to present small-scale operas in Sarasota from out-of-town in the 320-seat Asolo Theater. By 1974, the group had begun to produce its own operas. In 1979, the Guild bought the old Edwards Theatre for $150,000. The structure required major renovations to restore the facility and to accommodate the demands of opera production, so the Association began work in 1982, resulting in the new Sarasota Opera House appearing on the National Register of Historic Places in March 1984.

Further renovations between the end of the 2007 season and the opening of the 2008 season have led to a significantly-enhanced opera theatre.

The $20 million renovation included gutting the auditorium, which resulted in a newly configured seating plan; expansion of the public areas and Opera Club on the second level; re-opening the 3-story atrium, which was covered with a newly-installed skylight. The atrium and skylight was original to the building in 1926, but was covered by a ceiling and a chandelier used in the film, Gone with the Wind.  In 2008, the Sarasota Opera reopened with Verdi's Rigoletto. Seating was expanded to approximately 1,200, however, after the 2009-2010 season, some seats along the far sides were removed and replaced with aisles leaving 1,119 seats.

References

Further reading

External links
 Sarasota Opera website

National Register of Historic Places in Sarasota County, Florida
Theatres on the National Register of Historic Places in Florida
Opera houses in Florida
Tourist attractions in Sarasota County, Florida
Theatres completed in 1926
Music venues completed in 1926
Buildings and structures in Sarasota, Florida
Opera houses on the National Register of Historic Places
Event venues on the National Register of Historic Places in Florida
Opera houses on the National Register of Historic Places in Florida